RLML may refer to:

 Midlands Merit League
 23S rRNA (guanine2445-N2)-methyltransferase, an enzyme